The Bibliotheca, also known as the Bibliotheca of Pseudo-Apollodorus, is a compendium of Greek myths and heroic legends, arranged in three books, generally dated to the first or second century AD.

The author was traditionally thought to be Apollodorus of Athens, yet that attribution is now regarded as false, as a result  "Pseudo-" has been affixed to Apollodorus.

The Bibliotheca has been called "the most valuable mythographical work which has passed down from ancient times." An epigram recorded by the important intellectual Patriarch Photius I of Constantinople expressed its purpose:
It has the following not ungraceful epigram: 'Draw your knowledge of the past from me and read the ancient tales of learned lore. Look neither at the page of Homer, nor of elegy, nor tragic muse, nor epic strain. Seek not the vaunted verse of the cycle; but look in me and you will find in me all that the world contains'.

The brief and unadorned accounts of myth in the Bibliotheca have led some commentators to suggest that even its complete sections are an epitome of a lost work.

Pseudo-Apollodorus
A certain "Apollodorus" is indicated as author on some surviving manuscripts. This Apollodorus has been mistakenly identified with  Apollodorus of Athens (born c. 180 BC), a student of Aristarchus of Samothrace, mainly as it is known—from references in the minor scholia on Homer—that Apollodorus of Athens did leave a similar comprehensive repertory on mythology, in the form of a verse chronicle. The text which has survived to the present, however, cites a Roman author: Castor the Annalist, a contemporary of Cicero in the 1st century BC. The mistaken attribution was made by scholars following Photius' mention of the name, though Photius did not name him as the Athenian and the name was in common use at the time. As (for chronological reasons, Apollodorus of Athens could not have written the book) the author of the Bibliotheca is at times referred to as the "Pseudo-Apollodorus", to distinguish him from Apollodorus of Athens. Modern works often simply call him "Apollodorus".

One of his many sources was the Tragodoumena (Subjects of Tragedies) a 4th-century BC analysis of the myths in Greek tragedies by Asclepiades of Tragilus, the first known Greek mythographic compilation.

Manuscript tradition
The first mention of the work is by Photius in the 9th century. It was almost lost in the 13th century, surviving in one now-incomplete manuscript, which was copied for Cardinal Bessarion in the 15th century;  the other surviving manuscripts derive from Bessarion's copy.

Although the Bibliotheca is undivided in the manuscripts, it is conventionally divided into three books. Part of the third book, which breaks off abruptly in the story of Theseus, has been lost. Photius had the full work before him, as he mentions in his "account of books read" that it contained stories of the heroes of the Trojan War and the nostoi, missing in surviving manuscripts. Sir James George Frazer published an epitome of the book by conflating two manuscript summaries of the text, which included the lost part.

Printed editions
The first printed edition of the Bibliotheca was published in Rome in 1555, edited by Benedetto Egio (Benedictus Aegius) of Spoleto, who divided the text in three books, but made many unwarranted emendations in the very corrupt text.  published an improved text at Heidelberg, 1559. The first text based on comparative manuscripts was that of Christian Gottlob Heyne, Göttingen, 1782–83.

See also

References

Notes

Citations

Works cited 
 
 
 Diller, Aubrey. 1983. "The Text History of the Bibliotheca of Pseudo-Apollodorus." Pp. 199–216 in Studies in Greek Manuscript Tradition, edited by A. Diller. Amsterdam: A. M. Hakkert.
 Dowden, Ken. 1992. The Uses of Greek Mythology. London: Routledge. . Internet Archive.
 Fletcher, K. F. B. 2008. "Systematic Genealogies in Apollodorus’ Bibliotheca and the Exclusion of Rome from Greek Myth." Classical Antiquity 27:59–91. .
 Hard, Robin. 1997. Apollodorus: The Library of Greek Mythology. Oxford: Oxford University Press. .
 
 Higbie, Carolyn. 2007. "Hellenistic Mythographers." Pp. 237–54 in The Cambridge Companion to Greek Mythology, edited by R. D. Woodard. Cambridge: Cambridge University Press.
 Huys, Marc. 1997. "Euripides and the Tales from Euripides: Sources of Apollodoros' Bibliotheca?" Rheinisches Museum 140 308–27.
 Kenens, Ulrike. 2013. "Text and Transmission of Ps.-Apollodorus’ Bibliotheca: Avenues for Future Research." Pp. 95–114 in Writing Myth: Mythography in the Ancient World, edited by S. M. Trzaskoma and R. S. Smith. Leuven, Belgium: Peeters.
 Kenens, Ulrike. 2011. "The Sources of Ps.-Apollodorus' Library: A Case Study." Quaderni Urbinati di Cultura Classica 97:129–46. .
 Scully, Stephen. 2015. "Echoes of the Theogony in the Hellenistic and Roman Periods." In Hesiod's 'Theogony', From Near Eastern Creation Myths to 'Paradise Lost'. New York: Oxford University Press.
 
 
 Trzaskoma, Stephen. 2013. "Citation, Organization and Authorial Presence in Ps.-Apollodorus’ Bibliotheca." Pp. 75–94 in Writing Myth: Mythography in the Ancient World, edited by S. M. Trzaskoma and R. S. Smith. Leuven, Belgium: Peeters.
 Trzaskoma, Stephen M. and R. Scott Smith. 2008. "Hellas in the Bibliotheke of Apollodorus." Philologus 152(1):90–6. Online version at De Gruyter.

External links

Apollodorus The Library translated by J. G. Frazer
Works by Apollodorus at Perseus Digital Library
Mythographoi. Scriptores poetiace historiae graeci, Antonius Westermann (ed.), Brunsvigae sumptum fecit Georgius Westermann, 1843, pagg. 1-123.
Apollodori Bibliotheca, Immanuel Bekker (ed.), Lipsiae sumptibus et typis B. G. Teubneri, 1854.
Mythographi graeci, Richardus Wagner (ed.), vol. 1, Lipsiae in aedibus B. G. Teubneri, 1894: pp. 1-169 (the epitome in pp. 171-237).
Apollodorus, The Library translated by J. G. Frazer
Apollodorus the Mythographer
Online text: Apollodorus The Library translated by J. G. Frazer (condensed text)

Ancient Greek pseudepigrapha
1st-century books
2nd-century books
References on Greek mythology